Thomas Iddo Jenkinson (1877–1949) was an English professional footballer who played as a winger.

References

1877 births
1949 deaths
Footballers from Sheffield
English footballers
Association football wingers
Heeley F.C. players
Gainsborough Trinity F.C. players
Sheffield United F.C. players
Grimsby Town F.C. players
English Football League players